Boone County is a county located in the northern part of the U.S. state of Kentucky. As of the 2020 census, the population was 135,968, making it the fourth-most populous county in Kentucky. Its county seat is Burlington. The county was formed in 1798 from a portion of Campbell County. and was named for frontiersman Daniel Boone. It is the location of the Cincinnati/Northern Kentucky International Airport, which serves Cincinnati and the tri-state area.

History
Native Americans had once inhabited a large late historic village in Petersburg that contained "at least two periods of habitation dating to 1150 A.D. and 1400 A.D."

In 1729 an unknown Frenchman sketched an area on his chart at what is now Big Bone Lick State Park with a note that it was "where they found the bones of an elephant." Another Frenchman, Charles le Moyne de Longueuil (1687–1755), would later be credited with being the first to investigate the Big Bone Lick area.

In 1789, 10-year-old John Tanner was captured by Ojibwe Indians across from the mouth of the Great Miami River, while his Baptist minister father, brother, and their slaves were planting corn.

Boone County was created in 1798, and named after Daniel Boone.

Margaret Garner
On January 28, 1856, Robert and a pregnant Margaret "Peggy" Garner, together with family members, escaped and fled to Cincinnati, Ohio, along with several other slave families. Seventeen people were reported to have been in their party. In the coldest winter in 60 years, the Ohio River had frozen. The group crossed the ice just west of Covington, Kentucky at daybreak, and escaped to Cincinnati, then divided to avoid detection. They set out for Joseph Kite's house in Cincinnati.

Margaret Garner would become famous for slitting her own daughter's throat (Mary) to prevent her from going back into slavery when Archibald K. Gaines and his posse, along with Federal Marshals, caught up to the fleeing slaves at Joseph Kite's house.

Margaret Garner was first owned by, and may have been the daughter of, the plantation owner John Pollard Gaines himself. In December 1849, the plantation was  along with all the slaves to John P. Gaines' younger brother, Archibald K. Gaines. The Gaines family lived on a farm called Maplewood in Boone County, Kentucky, just west of Richwood Presbyterian Church, of which Archibald K. Gaines was a member. Three of Margaret Garner's children, including Mary, the daughter whose throat Margaret Garner slashed, were likely the children of Archibald K. Gaines, the only adult white male at Maplewood.  The timing suggests they were each conceived after his wife had become pregnant and was unavailable to him.

Margaret Garner's story was the inspiration for the novel Beloved (1987) by Nobel Prize winner Toni Morrison (that later was adapted into a film of the same name starring Oprah Winfrey), as well as for her libretto for the early 21st century opera Margaret Garner (2005), composed by Richard Danielpour.

Geography
Its location along the Ohio River was key to its early development, as the river was the major transportation route.

Adjacent counties
 Hamilton County, Ohio  (north)
 Kenton County  (east)
 Grant County  (south)
 Gallatin County  (southwest)
 Switzerland County, Indiana  (west)
 Ohio County, Indiana  (west)
 Dearborn County, Indiana  (northwest)

Demographics

As of the census of 2000, there were 85,991 people, 31,258 households, and 23,443 families residing in the county. The racial makeup of the county was 95.15% White, 1.52% Black or African American, 0.23% Native American, 1.29% Asian, 0.03% Pacific Islander, 0.75% from other races, and 1.03% from two or more races.  1.98% of the population were Hispanic or Latino of any race.

There were 31,258 households, out of which 39.80% had children under the age of 18 living with them, 61.60% were married couples living together, 9.80% had a female householder with no husband present, and 25.00% were non-families. 20.20% of all households were made up of individuals, and 6.20% had someone living alone who was 65 years of age or older.  The average household size was 2.73 and the average family size was 3.17.

In the county, the population was spread out, with 28.70% under the age of 18, 8.50% from 18 to 24, 33.50% from 25 to 44, 21.30% from 45 to 64, and 8.10% who were 65 years of age or older.  The median age was 33 years. For every 100 females there were 97.70 males.  For every 100 females age 18 and over, there were 94.70 males.

The median income for a household in the county was $53,593, and the median income for a family was $61,114. Males had a median income of $42,105 versus $27,414 for females. The per capita income for the county was $23,535.  About 4.40% of families and 5.60% of the population were below the poverty line, including 6.40% of those under age 18 and 7.70% of those age 65 or over.

Politics
Boone County is a solidly Republican county in presidential elections; the last time it voted Democratic was in 1964, when Lyndon B. Johnson won in a national landslide. In 1976, however, the county gave exactly the same number of votes to Democrat Jimmy Carter and Republican Gerald Ford.

Law enforcement

Before 2001, Boone County had a county police department providing general-service law enforcement to the unincorporated areas of the county. The police department was merged with the county sheriff's department in 2001, and the sheriff's department now serves that role.  the sheriff is Michael A. Helmig.

The Boone County Jail is a short-term incarceration facility serving all law enforcement agencies in Boone County, including the Kentucky State Police, the Florence Police Department, the Boone County Sheriff's Office, and the Cincinnati/Northern Kentucky International Airport Police Department. The Boone County Jail system consists of the main jail and a workcamp facility. The Main Jail has the capacity of housing 424 maximum, medium, and minimum security inmates. The workcamp houses 76 minimum security inmates.  the Jailer, who in Kentucky is elected separately from the Sheriff, is Jason Maydak.

Economy
Boone County is the location of the Cincinnati/Northern Kentucky International Airport, which includes the headquarters of DHL Express and Southern Air.

Major attractions
The Creation Museum (Petersburg), operated by the apologetics ministry Answers in Genesis, as well as Big Bone Lick State Park, "birthplace of American paleontology," are located in Boone County.

Communities

Cities
 Florence
 Union
 Walton

Census-designated places

 Burlington (county seat)
 Francisville
 Hebron
 Oakbrook
 Petersburg
 Rabbit Hash
 Verona

Other unincorporated communities

 Belleview
 Big Bone
 Bullittsville
 Constance
 Hamilton
 Limaburg
 McVille
 Richwood
 Taylorsport

The Disunited States of America
In the novel The Disunited States of America, written by Harry Turtledove, the county of Boone is its own separate state.

See also

 Abner Gaines House
 Big Bone Lick State Park
 Boone County Arboretum
 Dinsmore Homestead
 East Bend, Kentucky
 National Register of Historic Places listings in Boone County, Kentucky
 Richwood Presbyterian Church

References

External links

 Boone County government's website
 Historical Images and Texts of Boone County, Kentucky
 Chronicles of Boone County, Boone County Public Library
 Boone County Library's Local History website
 Kentucky Historical Markers in Boone County

 
1798 establishments in Kentucky
Kentucky counties on the Ohio River